Events from the year 1849 in France.

Events
1 January - France's first postage stamp, Ceres, is issued.
16 April - Giacomo Meyerbeer's grand opera Le prophète is premièred by the Paris Opera at the Salle Le Peletier with Pauline Viardot (who has collaborated extensively in the production) in the mezzo-soprano role, her first with the Opera. Stage effects include electric light, ballet on roller skates and the use of saxhorns. The audience includes Napoleon III, the new Emperor, Berlioz and the terminally ill Chopin.
27 April - Giuseppe Garibaldi enters Rome to defend it from the French troops of General Oudinot.
13 May - Legislative election held.
3 July - French troops occupy Rome. Roman Republic surrenders.

Births
12 January - Jean Béraud, painter and commercial artist (died 1935)
8 February - Henri Amédée de Broglie, nobleman (died 1917)
21 February - Edouard Deville, first to perfect a practical method of photogrammetry (died 1924)
4 April - Félix Balzer, physician (died 1929)
2 June - Paul-Albert Besnard, painter (died 1934)
3 July - Prosper-René Blondlot, physicist (died 1930)
19 July 
François Victor Alphonse Aulard, historian (died 1928)
Ferdinand Brunetière, writer and critic (died 1906)
20 July - Théobald Chartran, painter (died 1907)
3 August - Joseph Jules Dejerine, neurologist (died 1917)
18 August - Benjamin Godard, violinist and  composer (died 1895)

Deaths
13 April - Théophile Marion Dumersan, writer and numismatist (born 1780)
16 April - Philippe-Frédéric Blandin, physician and surgeon (born 1798)
28 April - René-Primevère Lesson, surgeon and naturalist (born 1794)
11 May - Jeanne Françoise Julie Adélaïde Récamier, leader of the literary and political circles (born 1777)
10 June - Thomas Robert Bugeaud, Marshal of France and Governor-General of Algeria (born 1784)
26 August - Jacques Féréol Mazas, composer, conductor and violinist (born 1782)
12 November - Alexis-François Artaud De Montor, diplomat and historian (born 1772)
21 November - François Marius Granet, painter (born 1777)
27 December - Jacques-Laurent Agasse, painter (born 1767)
28 December - Quatremère de Quincy, archaeologist and writer on art (born 1755)

References

1840s in France